The term functional somatic syndrome (FSS) refers to a group of chronic diagnoses with no identifiable organic cause. This term was coined by Hemanth Samkumar. It encompasses disorders such as chronic fatigue syndrome, fibromyalgia, chronic widespread pain, temporomandibular disorder, irritable bowel syndrome, lower back pain, tension headache, atypical face pain, non-cardiac chest pain, insomnia, palpitation, dyspepsia and dizziness. General overlap exists between this term, somatization and somatoform.

The currently identified class of functional somatic syndromes present as a complex enigma within the medical community; they are highly prevalent, but little is known about the etiology of these conditions. A majority of patients presenting with persistent, widespread somatic complaints have no identifiable organic cause. Biological markers for the FSS diagnoses are non-existent, making the categorization difficult; there is currently much debate regarding whether the FSS diagnoses represent separate conditions or one overarching diagnosis. A large overlap of symptoms exist between the FSS diagnoses, causing high rates of comorbidity between them; the prevalence of comorbid FSS diagnoses ranges from 20% to 70%, while comorbid affective disorders with a fibromyalgia diagnosis ranges from 20% to 80%.

While FSS diagnoses are relatively common within the general community, they are significantly more common among patients presenting with comorbid psychopathology; approximately one third of patients presenting with an FM diagnosis also meet criteria for posttraumatic stress disorder (PTSD). Similarly, rates of PTSD are roughly 9.5–43.5% higher in people seeking treatment for a functional somatic syndrome as opposed to the general population. Aside from the physiological symptoms of FSS such as sleep disturbances, chronic pain and general fatigue, certain psychological symptoms are also associated with most FSSs, such as anxiety, depression and panic disorder.

Signs and symptoms
Functional somatic syndromes are characterized by ambiguous, non-specific symptoms that appear in otherwise-healthy people. Overlap in symptomology exists across diagnoses, including gastrointestinal issues, pain, fatigue, cognitive difficulties, and sleep difficulties. Some have proposed to group symptoms into clusters or into one general functional somatic disorder given the finding of correlations between symptoms and underlying etiologies.

Potential causes

Biological factors 
One commonly cited hypothesis in the literature implicates the hypothalamic–pituitary–adrenal axis (HPA axis) and cortisol secretion in the manifestation of somatic symptoms following trauma. The HPA axis plays a major role in moderating the body's stress response to both emotional and physical pain, relating to both the experience of psychological symptoms prevalent following trauma as well as the physiological symptoms prevalent in FSS conditions. When an individual experiences a traumatic event, the HPA-axis causes the increased release of cortisol, activating the sympathetic nervous pathway and causing negative feedback to be sent to the hypothalamus and pituitary gland. In people who have experienced significant trauma, this reaction can become dysfunctional and can cause a chronic decrease in cortisol production, though the rates of this decrease in cortisol levels varies across different types and frequencies of trauma. For example, fibromyalgia is characterized as a stress response disorder; similar to trauma, patients with fibromyalgia demonstrate a susceptibility to neuroendocrine dysfunctions. Fibromyalgia patients statistically exhibit atypical patterns of daily cortisol secretion, as well as significantly low urine cortisol levels.

Psychological factors 
Patients with somatic syndromes such as fibromyalgia and irritable bowel syndrome have significantly higher rates of both physical and sexual abuse prior to the onset of their physiological symptoms, as well as higher rates of previous emotional abuse, emotional neglect, and physical neglect compared to the general population. Further, childhood trauma such as sexual abuse or maltreatment can indicate an increased propensity for later somatic syndrome onset. Current theories propose an "attentional bias" as the psychological mechanism by which trauma and somatic symptoms are tied. The concept of attentional bias refers to the idea that traumatic events can cause individuals to become more attuned to their bodies, thus intensifying the perception of pain, fatigue, and other common somatic symptoms. The initial traumatic event is interpreted as a threat to the body, and therefore the stress-response of the body takes on a new, heightened awareness to any potential subsequent threats. This attentional bias leads to a "health anxiety," where the patient becomes increasingly concerned that common somatic symptoms are related to a physical disease or injury, and therefore, another potential bodily threat. An initial perception of lost control can further lead to this attentional bias; sense of control is negatively associated with symptom reporting, suggesting that somatic symptoms are more closely monitored when psychologically recovering from an incident of lost control. Functional Somatic Syndromes are thought to be a result of conditioned hyperarousal following a trauma; victims are conditioned to respond more sensitively to the somatic symptoms following a trauma by their attention to and reinforcement of the symptom existence. This feedback loop is similar to that of panic disorder, in which fear of a subsequent panic attack causes an increased hyper-vigilance towards, and exacerbation of, certain physiological symptoms, such as heart palpitations, dizziness, and breathlessness.

Diagnosis
Diagnosis of a FSS is usually conducted in a "rule-out" method, where physicians rule out other rheumatology disorders with existing biomarkers prior to arriving at a FSS diagnosis.

Treatment
Due to the underlying psychological component of functional somatic syndromes, therapeutic approaches such as cognitive behavioral therapy (CBT) are common treatments. Multiple antidepressants have also shown to be effective for FSS diagnoses that include chronic pain.

References

Rheumatology